Simone Tempestini (born 12 August 1994) is a Romanian rally driver. He won the 2016 Junior World Rally Championship with the Romanian team Napoca Rally Academy and the Romanian Rally Championship in 2015, 2016, and 2018.

Short biography 

Tempestini made his competition debut in 2009. He won the 2015 and 2016 Romanian Rally Championship driving a Ford Fiesta R5 (and a Citroën DS3 R3T Max, in the last round of 2016) for the Napoca Rally Academy team, followed by another two champion titles, in 2018 and 2019.

Tempestini won both the 2016 JWRC and the WRC 3 categories of the World Rally Championship, driving for the same team. As part of his prize, he competes in the 2017 World Rally Championship-2 driving a Citroën DS3 R5.

He stated that he feels "100% Romanian" although he is the son of the Romanian-Italian driver Marco Tempestini. He has also competed in WRC with an Italian licence.

Results

WRC results

JWRC results

WRC-3 results

WRC-2 results

References

External links  

Official website 
 ewrc-results.com - Simone Tempestini

1994 births
Romanian rally drivers
Italian rally drivers
Living people
World Rally Championship drivers
European Rally Championship drivers
Romanian people of Italian descent